With One Last Breath are an English metalcore band from York, England.

History

Formation, self-titled EP and single (2008-2012) 
The band was formed in 2008 with original members Sam Graves, Joe Graves, Chris Bowling and Jake Holmes. In 2010, they released their first EP of the same name. The EP included guest vocals from Danny Worsnop of Asking Alexandria and Davey Richmond of Glamour of the Kill, but sometime after the release, bassist Jake Holmes left the band and was replaced by Joe Lancaster (formerly of Asking Alexandria). Also in 2011, The band recruited Spencer Costello as their new lead singer. The band released a series of independent singles including Hell We Create, Forgive Never Forget and After the Suffering which was accompanied with a music video.

Record deal, Spencers departure and The Fearless Ones (2013–present) 
In early 2013, it was announced that Spencer Costello had parted ways with the band, and due to this Sam Graves who was previously the guitarist and the initial frontman of the band, became the main vocalist once again, with Alex Scott taking his place on guitar.
The band released their second EP in 2013 along with a music video for 'Until The End'. In January 2014, it was announced that the band had been working on their debut album titled The Fearless Ones and was set to be released on 14 April the same year. The announcement was followed with a release of a single of the same name from the record. On 3 March 2014, the band released preorders for the album on iTunes, which included the playlist and a new song was included with the preorder, "Broken." On the album, there will be rerecordings of four old songs: "Hell We Create," "Forgive, Never Forget," "After the Suffering," and "Wake it Up." On 29 March, the band announced that Joe Graves had left the band to pursue a career in musical engineering, however this has not hindered the bands progress in releasing the album and has not disrupted their touring.

Musical style 
ALLSCHOOLS describes the musical style as a mix of Bullet for My Valentine and Asking Alexandria. On highwiredaze.com called critic Kenneth Morton Heavy Metal as an influence in the music style of the band. The song I'm Taking Over (Thanks To You) Morton described as a hybrid of In Flames and A Skylit Drive.

Band members 

Current
 Sam Graves - lead vocals (2008-2010, 2013–present), bass guitar (2014-present), rhythm guitar (2008-2013), backing vocals (2010-2013)
 Alex Scott - guitars (2013–present)
 Chris Bowling - drums (2008–present)

Past
 Joe Lancaster - bass (2010–2014)
 Jake Holmes - bass (2008-2010)
 Spencer Costello - lead vocals (2010-2013)
 Joe Graves - lead guitar, backing vocals (2008-2014)

Timeline

Discography

Studio albums

EPs

Singles

Music videos

References 

Musical groups established in 2008
English metalcore musical groups
English heavy metal musical groups